The Cowboy Rides Away Tour was a concert tour by American country music artist George Strait. The tour was divided into two legs: 21 concerts in 2013 and 27 concerts in 2014, for a total of 48 concerts, all in the United States. The tour started on January 18, 2013 in Lubbock, Texas, and ended in Arlington, Texas, on June 7, 2014. Strait was supported on the tour by his longtime eleven-member touring group, the Ace in the Hole Band. Appearing in arenas with six stadium dates included, Strait performed many of his most popular recordings and performance songs, including uptempo hits such as "Here for a Good Time", "Ocean Front Property", "How 'Bout Them Cowgirls", and "Troubadour", and softer ballads such as "I Saw God Today", "The Chair", and "I Can Still Make Cheyenne". His encores included "All My Ex's Live in Texas" and "Folsom Prison Blues", and he closed each show with one of his earliest hit songs, "The Cowboy Rides Away". This song that inspired the name for the tour was written by Sonny Throckmorton and Casey Kelly.

The tour received positive reviews, with one reviewer calling his shows "an embarrassment of riches", and another recognizing Strait's "compelling stage presence and vocal power". All 48 concerts were sold out, and for the week of February 7, 2014, the Cowboy Rides Away Tour was the top-grossing tour in the United States. The final concert at AT&T Stadium in Arlington, Texas, which featured special guests Martina McBride, Kenny Chesney, Eric Church, Vince Gill, Jason Aldean, Faith Hill, Alan Jackson, Miranda Lambert, and Sheryl Crow, drew 104,793 fans—the largest attendance at a single-show concert in the United States, as well as the largest attendance at any “indoor” concert in U.S. history. The concert also set a record for the largest gross at a single-show country concert, $18,194,374. In 2013 he was named Country Music Association Entertainer of the Year, and in 2014 he was named Academy of Country Music Entertainer of the Year.

Background
Strait began performing live shows with the Ace in the Hole Band in San Marcos, Texas in October 1975. In 1981, after Strait signed a record contract with MCA Records, they became his permanent touring band and have accompanied him on every tour for over thirty years. On September 26, 2012, Strait announced that he was retiring from touring, and that his upcoming tour, titled The Cowboy Rides Away Tour, would be his last.

Description

The concerts were set mainly in arenas with six stadium dates included, and typically consisted of a one-hour opening act—Martina McBride for most of the 2013 concerts—followed by a half hour intermission. Strait then performed a two-hour set of about 33 songs representing all phases of his music career. Wearing his usual black Resistol cowboy hat, pressed Wrangler jeans, a button-down Western shirt, large silver belt buckle, and low heel cowboy boots, Strait performed in the round with the eleven-member Ace in the Hole Band distributed centrally on the stage with Strait singing from each corner of the square stage in two-song segments.  The Ace in the Hole Band consists of Terry Hale (bass), Mike Daily (steel guitar), Ron Huckaby (piano), Rick McRae (electric guitar, fiddle), Benny McArthur (electric guitar, fiddle), Mike Kennedy (drums), Gene Elders (fiddle), Joe Manuel (acoustic guitar), John Michael Whitby (keyboards), Marty Slayton (background vocals), and Thom Flora (background vocals). Strait played a black Taylor PS10ce Dreadnought Presentation Series guitar on every song.

Strait's setlist typically consisted of a mix of his most popular recordings and performance songs, including uptempo hits like "Here for a Good Time", "Ocean Front Property", "Check Yes or No", "Marina Del Rey", "How 'Bout Them Cowgirls", "Give It Away", "Amarillo by Morning", and "Troubadour", offset by softer ballads like "I Saw God Today", "The Chair", "Living for the Night", "I Can Still Make Cheyenne", and "I'll Always Remember You". His performances were delivered "with no flash or hurry". Strait's set was briefly interrupted by a ten-minute presentation given by Retired General Leroy Sisco of the Military Warriors Support Foundation to honor a wounded serviceman with the gift of a house. Strait typically performed three to five encore songs, including "All My Ex's Live in Texas" and "Folsum Prison Blues", one of a handful of cover songs he adds to the set each concert. Strait closed each show with one of his earliest hit songs, "The Cowboy Rides Away".

The Cowboy Rides Away Tour closed with three stadium concerts. At the final concert on June 7, 2014 at AT&T Stadium in Arlington, Texas, Martina McBride joined an all-star bill that included Kenny Chesney, Eric Church, Vince Gill, Faith Hill, Alan Jackson, Miranda Lambert, Lee Ann Womack, Sheryl Crow, and Asleep at the Wheel. The concert drew 104,793 fans—the largest attendance at a single-show concert in the United States. The concert also set a record for the largest gross at a single-show country concert, $18,194,374. A live album recorded from the final concert in Arlington titled The Cowboy Rides Away: Live from AT&T Stadium was released on September 16, 2014, with a DVD of the concert being released on November 10, 2014, with Walmart exclusively releasing a deluxe edition including the cd as well. On August 29, 2014, the Country Music Television channel broadcast a two-hour concert special of the event titled George Strait: The Cowboy Rides Away. The concert was recorded by Chuck Ainlay with David Hewitt on Remote Recording's Silver Truck.

During the first leg of the tour, Strait was named the Country Music Association Entertainer of the Year in November 2013. During the second leg of the tour, he was named the Academy of Country Music Entertainer of the Year in April 2014.

Critical response
In his review for the Austin Chronicle, Doug Freeman praised the artist's performance for the first concert of the 2014 leg of the tour, and his selection of songs that "only skim the depth of his catalog". Freeman noted that despite the changes that have taken place in popular country music, Strait has "remained the genre's compass". Freeman concluded:

In his review for AZCentral, Jason P. Woodbury praised Strait's February 7, 2014 concert at the US Airways Center in Phoenix, calling his performance "an embarrassment of riches". Woodbury observed:

Woodbury concluded, "He's a subtle performer, and the classic sense of regret and longing he brings to songs like 'You Look So Good in Love', 'Nobody in His Right Mind Would've Left Here', and 'A Fire I Can't Put Out' is tempered by soft humor and wit."

In his review for Billboard magazine, Thom Duffy praised Strait's March 1, 2014 performance at the Prudential Center in Newark, noting his ability to "turn musical moods at ease, as if guiding a favorite horse on a tricky trail". Duffy concluded:

For the week of February 7, 2014, the Cowboy Rides Away Tour was the top-grossing tour in the United States, earning $6.4 million in four sold out arena concerts.

Tour dates

Gallery

References

External links
 Official website
 Official tour page
 "Cowboys Like Us" 
 "How 'Bout Them Cowgirls" and "Run" 
 "I Believe" 
 "The Cowboy Rides Away" 

2013 concert tours
2014 concert tours
Farewell concert tours
George Strait concert tours